Novakia is a genus of flies belonging to the family Mycetophilidae.

The species of this genus are found in Europe and Northern America.

Species:
 Novakia lisae Kerr, 2007 
 Novakia miloi Kerr, 2007

References

Mycetophilidae